is a 1965 Japanese action film directed by Kengo Furusawa, with special effects by Eiji Tsuburaya. It is the fifth in Crazy strategy film series produced from 1963 to 1971.

The Crazy Adventure was released theatrically in Japan on October 31, 1965. It received a theatrical release in the United States on December 21, 1966 under the title Don't Call Me a Con Man and was re-released on June 1, 1993 under the title Don't Cal Me a Crime Man.

Cast

Release 
The Crazy Adventure was released in Japan on October 31, 1965  where it was distributed by Toho. and received a theatrical release in the United States on December 21, 1966 as Don't Call Me a Con Man and was re-released on June 1, 1993 as Don't Cal Me a Crime Man

References

External links 

 
 

1965 films
Japanese comedy films
1960s Japanese films